William Fay Vargus (November 11, 1899 – February 12, 1979) was a Major League Baseball pitcher who played for two seasons. He pitched for the Boston Braves for 11 games during the 1925 Boston Braves season and four games during the 1926 Boston Braves season.

External links

1899 births
1979 deaths
Boston Braves players
Major League Baseball pitchers
Baseball players from Massachusetts
People from Scituate, Massachusetts
Sportspeople from Plymouth County, Massachusetts